Cymbalophora is a genus of tiger moths in the family Erebidae described by Rambur in 1866.

Species
Cymbalophora haroldi
Cymbalophora oertzeni
Cymbalophora powelli
Cymbalophora pudica
Cymbalophora rivularis

References

External links

Callimorphina
Moth genera